The variable antshrike (Thamnophilus caerulescens) is a species of bird in the family Thamnophilidae found widely in South America. It is, as its common name suggests, arguably the species of antbird with the most variable plumage.

Taxonomy
The variable antshrike was described by the French ornithologist Louis Vieillot in 1816 and given its current binomial name Thamnophilus caerulescens. Its highly variable plumage, some variations in the voice, and its unusual distribution have resulted in widespread speculations that it involves more than one species. Studies involving mtDNA and voice of the Bolivian populations, which is a meeting point for several of the distinctly different subspecies, did not support the theory of several species, instead suggesting that much of the vocal variation is clinal and geneflow between various populations remains uninterrupted. The taxa in north-eastern Brazil, which also are relatively distinctive, were not included in these studies, and it therefore remains unclear if they are worthy of species recognition. Another problem relates to the variations within subspecies. The subspecies dinellii and cearensis, for example, are both variable, resulting in the description of additional subspecies for some sub-populations.

Description
The male has black wings with grey edging to the remiges (sometimes very narrow, and barely visible in the subspecies where the males are primarily black), and white wing-bars that may appear spotty, especially on the lesser wing coverts. The tail is black with white tips (best visible from below). In the eastern, central and southern subspecies, the chest and most of the head are grey, the back is grey with variable amounts of black (may be almost entirely black), a semi-concealed white interscapular patch, and the crown is black (black crown reduced in far north-eastern Brazil). The variation in the colour of the belly and crissum (the undertail coverts surrounding the cloaca) is highly complex, ranging from white in some subspecies, over grey in others, to deep cinnamon. The male of the western subspecies melanochrous from the Andes of Peru is strikingly different, being overall black except for the white in its wings and tail. The male of the subspecies aspersiventer of the Andes in north-western Bolivia and adjacent Peru approaches melanochrous in colour, but has dense white barring to the belly.

Females are equally variable. In most of this species range, their wings are blackish-brown with rufescent edging to the remiges, and white or buff wing-bars (often appears rather spotty). In north-eastern Brazil, however, the wing-bars are greatly reduced, and, in the population in Ceará, to the extent where it essentially is lacking. The tail resembles that of the males, but is often more brownish. The underparts are rich orange-cinnamon, in a few subspecies extending as far up as the chest, but in most the chest is pale brownish or grey. The back is brown and the head is pure grey or pale grey tinged brown, while most subspecies have a brown crown, which, however, is black in parts of central Brazil and in the Andean subspecies melanochrous and aspersiventer. Both sexes of all subspecies have grey legs and a stubby bill that is grey below, blackish above. Some subspecies are easily confused with the slaty antshrikes, but these differ consistently in their broad white edging to the tertials.

Distribution and habitat

The variable antshrike is found widely in eastern and southern Brazil, with disjunct populations in Ceará, Pernambuco and Alagoas. From southern Brazil, its range extends through Uruguay, Paraguay, northern Argentina, Bolivia, and along the eastern slope of the Andes in Peru, as far north as the Amazonas Region.

It occurs in a wide range of densely to lightly wooded habitats, ranging from the edge of humid forest to arid woodland. In large parts of its range it can be found in lowlands, but it is primarily found in foothills in north-eastern Brazil, and is restricted to highlands up to 2600 meters (8500 ft), locally to 3000 m (9800 ft), throughout a large part of its Andean range.

Behavior
In terms of behavior, this is a typical Thamnophilus antshrike. It is generally found singly or in pairs at low levels, often within dense undergrowth. Consequently, it can often be difficult to see it well. It feeds primarily on insects and other arthropods. Seeds and fruits have also been reported. While foraging, it is regularly seen "dipping" its tail and flicking its wings. Breeding is seasonal, but exact timing depends on the region. The nest is a woven cup, generally placed rather low. Both sexes incubate the 2-3 eggs. In southeastern Brazil, breeding begins in October and continues through January. While predation is often the cause of nest failure, pairs can renest fairly rapidly and can also have more than one successful nest each season. Also, food abundance was shown, experimentally, to influence several measures of reproductive effort, including clutch size.

Status

It is generally common and consequently considered to be of least concern by BirdLife International and IUCN. The subspecies cearensis in far north-eastern Brazil is limited to a region with extensive habitat destruction, and its status may give cause for concern.

References

variable antshrike
Birds of South America
Birds of Brazil
Birds of Uruguay
Birds of Paraguay
Birds of Argentina
Birds of Bolivia
Birds of Peru
variable antshrike
Taxa named by Louis Jean Pierre Vieillot
Taxonomy articles created by Polbot